San José is a district of the Alajuela canton, in the Alajuela province of Costa Rica.

Geography 
San José has an area of  km² and an elevation of  metres.

Demographics 

For the 2011 census, San José had a population of  inhabitants.

Transportation

Road transportation 
The district is covered by the following road routes:
 National Route 1
 National Route 3
 National Route 118
 National Route 727

Rail transportation 
The Interurbano Line operated by Incofer goes through this district.

References 

Districts of Alajuela Province
Populated places in Alajuela Province